Fikret Orman (born 4 November 1967) is a Turkish businessman and sports executive.

Career
He has a degree in civil engineering. Orman has been involved in the construction and tourism sectors.

On March 25, 2012, Orman became the 33rd president of Beşiktaş J.K., receiving 4,025 of the 4,545 votes cast in the extraordinary congress held after previous president Yıldırım Demirören resigned to be appointed at Turkish Football Federation. He was re-elected at the next ordinary congress in 2013, and once again in May 2016. His latest term ended in May 2019.

On 24 September 2019, Orman announced his resignation from Beşiktaş J.K. During his 7.5 years of tenure, commercial debts of club raised from TRY580 million up to TRY2.6 billion. During same period, there were total of 77 transfers made in and out, including Pepe, Mario Gómez, Demba Ba, Anderson Talisca, Jose Sosa, Gary Medel, Alvaro Negredo and Domagoj Vida.

References

External links

 Profile at Beşiktaş J.K.

1967 births
Businesspeople from Istanbul
Living people
Turkish civil engineers
University of Florida alumni
Beşiktaş J.K. presidents